Martina Jerant (born 30 January 1974) is a Canadian basketball player. She competed in the women's tournament at the 1996 Summer Olympics.

References

External links
 

1974 births
Living people
Canadian women's basketball players
Olympic basketball players of Canada
Basketball players at the 1996 Summer Olympics
Basketball players from Windsor, Ontario